Chaudhry Sir Muhammad Zafarullah Khan  (‎; 6 February 1893 – 1 September 1985) was a Pakistani jurist and diplomat who served as the first Foreign Minister of Pakistan. After serving as foreign minister he continued his international career and is the only Pakistani to preside over the International Court of Justice. He also served as the President of the UN General Assembly. He is the only person to date to serve as the President of both UN General Assembly and the International Court of Justice.

Khan became one of the most vocal proponents of Pakistan and led the case for the separate nation in the Radcliffe Commission which drew the countries of modern-day South Asia. He moved to Karachi in August 1947 and became a member of Pakistan's first cabinet serving as the country's debut foreign minister under the Liaquat administration. He remained Pakistan's top diplomat until 1954 when he left to serve on the International Court of Justice and remained on the court as a judge until 1958 when he became the court's vice president. He left the Hague in 1961 to become the Permanent Representative of Pakistan to the United Nations, a position he served until 1964.

During his time at the UN, he also represented the State of Palestine in a de facto capacity. He left the UN in 1964 to return to the ICJ and, in 1970, he became the first and only Pakistani to serve as the President of the International Court of Justice, a position he maintained until 1973. He returned to Pakistan and retired in Lahore where he died in 1985 at the age of 92. Khan is considered one of the leading founding fathers of Pakistan and a prominent figure in Pakistan. He authored several books on Islam both in Urdu and English.

Family and early life

Family

Chaudhry Zafarullah Khan was born on 6 February 1893 in the City of Sialkot in Sialkot District. His family were Zamindars of Sahi Jat extraction based around Daska and were of the headman of their village the other being a Sahi Sikh Sardar. Khan's family had suffered a decline during the Sikh era due to government favoritism towards Sikhs and the early death of his Great Grandfather which resulted in his grandfather, Chaudhry Sikandar Khan to become the village headman in his adolescence.  However, over time, Chaudhry Sikander Khan regained much of the family's status and became a widely respected around Daska. Sikandar Khan's son and Zafarullah Khan's father, Chaudhry Nasrullah Khan became part of the first wave of Landed Gentry of Sialkot to receive a western education and became one of the most prominent lawyers of Sialkot district. Both of his parents were deeply religious members of the Ahmadiyya Muslim movement.

Khan's mother, Hussain Bibi, belonged to a well to do Zamindar family hailing from the Bajwa tribe of Jats. She was his father's maternal first cousin. Hussain Bibi and Zafarullah Khan were incredibly close and Khan called her the most powerful influence in his life. Hussain Bibi was deeply religious and was known for her exceptionally firm belief in God. Hussain Bibi had lost her first two children in their infancy. Relatives thought it was because she had refused to give offerings demanded by Jai Devi, a self acclaimed village witch, who villagers thought delved in black magic. They urged her to appease Jai Devi, however, Hussain Bibi bluntly refused even after mounting pressure from the family after the second infant's death. Arguing that she would gladly give charity to Jai Devi but since Jai Devi had claimed to control her infants ability to live or die she could not as it violated her faith. Stating that it would be tantamount to Shirk as only Allah controlled who lived or died.

Education

He studied at Government College, Lahore and received his L.L.B. from King's College London in 1914. He was called to the bar at Lincoln's Inn, London. He practised law in Sialkot and Lahore, became a member of the Punjab Legislative Council in 1926.

Career

Muhammad Zafarullah Khan have practiced law in Colonial India. He was the counsel for Ahmadiyya cause in two landmark judgement in this regard. The two case are the 1916, the Patna High Court gave a verdict on Hakim Khalil Ahmad Vs. Malik Israfil case  this gave Ahmadis to use religious places of Islam for prayers. and the 1922, Madras High Court verdict on Narantakath Avullah v. Parakkal Mammu case in which court remarked Ahmadiyya as a part of Islam.

Zafarullah was elected a member of the Punjab Legislative Council in 1926 and presided at the Delhi meeting of the All-India Muslim League in 1931, where he advocated the cause of the Indian Muslims through his presidential address. He participated at the Round Table Conferences held from 1930 to 1932 and became the Minister of Railways in May 1935. In 1939, he represented India at the League of Nations. He was appointed the Agent General of India in China in 1942 and represented India as the Indian Government's nominee at the Commonwealth Relations Conference in 1945, where he spoke on India's cause for freedom.

From 1935 to 1941, he was a member of the Executive Council of the Viceroy of India. Sir Zafarullah Khan prepared a note on future of dominion status of India analyzing the future prospects of "Dominion Status". It took into account concerns of Muslims and ultimately proposed a plan for division of subcontinent. This note was sent to Lord Zetland, Secretary of State for India, as referred in a letter by Lord Linlithgow dated 12 March1940.

Lord Linlithgow, however, had not a complete grasp of contents in the analytic note prepared by Sir Zafarullah khan at the time it was sent to Secretary of India. A copy of this note was sent to Jinnah. Sir Zafarullah khan's proposal of a two-state solution for Indian Federation was adopted by the Muslim League with a view to give it full publicity in the forthcoming session at Lahore 22–24 March.

In September 1941, Zafarullah Khan was appointed a Judge of the Federal Court of India, a position he held until June 1947. At the request of Muhammad Ali Jinnah, he represented the Muslim League in July 1947 before the Radcliffe Boundary Commission and presented the case of the Muslims in a highly commendable manner. Zafarullah Khan advised the Nawab of Junagadh that if he decided to join his state with Pakistan, it would be both moral and legal. The Nawab then proceeded to announce his decision.

In October 1947, Zafarullah Khan represented Pakistan at the United Nations General Assembly as head of the Pakistani delegation and advocated the position of the Muslim world on the Palestinian issue. That year, he was appointed Pakistan's first Foreign Minister, a post he held for seven years. Between 1948 and 1954, he also represented Pakistan at the United Nations Security Council where he advocated the liberation of occupied Kashmir, Libya, Northern Ireland, Eritrea, Somalia, Sudan, Tunisia, Morocco, and Indonesia.

As Foreign Minister, he represented Pakistan at the Manila Treaty Conference in September 1954. Support for the Manila Pact in Pakistan was divided, with West Pakistan dominated army and a handful of leaders in favour of this, while most elected members of the Constituent Assembly from West Pakistan and all of the Assembly members from East Pakistan opposed it. Zafarullah signed the Manila Pact, committing Pakistan's accession to the Southeast Asia Treaty Organization (SEATO).

In 1954, he became a Judge at the International Court of Justice (ICJ) in The Hague, a position he held until 1961. He was the Vice-President of the International Court of Justice from 1958 to 1961. Between 1961 and 1964, he was Pakistan's Permanent Representative at the United Nations. From 1962 to 1964, he was also the President of the UN General Assembly. He later rejoined the ICJ as a judge from 1964 to 1973, serving as president from 1970 to 1973.

Religion

As an Ahmadi, Zafarullah Khan held the office of Ameer (president) of the Lahore, Pakistan chapter of the Community from 1919 to 1935. He served as Secretary to Khalifatul Masih II, the second successor of Mirza Ghulam Ahmad, at the Majlis-e-Shura (Consultative Council) for the first time in 1924, and continued to do so for 17 more sessions. In addition, he was a member of the delegation which represented the Ahmadiyya Community at the All Parties Conference held in 1924. In 1927, he acted successfully as representative counsel for the Muslims of the Punjab in the contempt of court case against the Muslim Outlook.

As Pakistan's first Foreign Minister, Zafarullah Khan addressed the Constituent Assembly of Pakistan in the days leading up to the passing of the Objectives Resolution. The Objectives Resolution, which combined features of both Western and Islamic democracy, is one of the most important documents in the constitutional history of Pakistan. It was designed to provide equal rights for all citizens of Pakistan, regardless of their race, religion or background. Zafarullah Khan was quoted as saying:

In March 1958, Zafarullah Khan performed Umrah and, at the same time, visited the shrine of Prophet Muhammad in Medina, Saudi Arabia. During his visit, he met with the King of Saudi Arabia Saud of Saudi Arabia, and stayed at the Royal Palace as a personal guest of the king. In 1967, he returned to Saudi Arabia to perform Hajj, a religious duty that must be carried out at least once in a lifetime by every able-bodied Muslim who can afford to do so.

Legacy

Khan's legacy has been hailed and his paramount role in the creation of Pakistan has been celebrated in the history of Pakistan. He is popularly known by his title Sir. Zafarullah Khan openly acknowledged that he belonged to the Ahmadiyya Muslim Community (Not Muslim Community as per Sharia and Pakistan Law). He was selected by Muhammad Ali Jinnah as the first Foreign Minister of Pakistan. He was one of the most influential, skilled, and passionate diplomats of his time.

In a personal tribute, King Hussein bin Tallal of Jordan said:

Muhammad Fadhel al-Jamali, a former Prime Minister of Iraq, in a tribute on his death, wrote:

An editorial in Dawn of Karachi stated that:

Bibliography

Books

Speeches

Biographies

References

External links

Sir Muhammad Zafrulla Khan in United Nations – Short Video Clips

Pictures of Sir Muhammad Zafrulla Khan
Elected President of the seventeenth session of the General Assembly (UN)
Round Table Conferences (1930–33)
Remembering Zafrulla Khan by Khalid Hasan
Chaudhry Muhammad Zafarullah Khan's Services to Pakistan and The Muslim World
Brief Life Sketch of Chaudhry Sir Muhammad Zafarullah Khan

|-

|-

|-

1893 births
1985 deaths
Alumni of King's College London
Foreign Ministers of Pakistan
Government College University, Lahore alumni
Leaders of the Pakistan Movement
Pakistani Ahmadis
Punjabi people
People from Sialkot District
Pakistani expatriates in England
Pakistani judges
Permanent Representatives of Pakistan to the United Nations
Presidents of the International Court of Justice
Presidents of the United Nations General Assembly
Members of the Central Legislative Assembly of India
Pakistani MNAs 1947–1954
Pakistani judges of United Nations courts and tribunals
Members of the Council of the Governor General of India
Members of the Constituent Assembly of Pakistan
All India Muslim League members
Indian people of World War II
Indian knights
Knights Bachelor
Knights Commander of the Order of the Star of India